Eiguliai is neighborhood in the city of Kaunas, Lithuania. Eiguliai elderate encompass Eiguliai, Kleboniškis and part of Kalniečiai neighbourhoods. Elderate itself is located on the left bank of the Neris River. The distance from Eiguliai neighborhood to Kaunas centre is approximately 6 km. The settlement was a small village until it was incorporated into Kaunas in 1959 and a residential microdistrict was built in 1979. The 7th Fort of the Kaunas Fortress are located in this eldership. The borough borders Dainava in the east, Žaliakalnis in the south, Vilijampolė and Šilainiai in the west and Domeikava with Lapės in the north. It has 40,453 inhabitants which represent 13.82 % of the population of Kaunas city municipality.

Cemetery 
A number of famous people were buried in the Eiguliai cemetery:
 Jonas Bulota (1855–1942), organist, veterinarian
 Stepas Butautas (1925–2001), sports activists
 Klemensas Čerbulėnas (1912–1986), ethnographer and art critic, architectural historian
 Valerija Čiurlionytė-Karužienė (1896–1991), cultural activist
 Saulius Gricius (1963–1991), deputy of Kaunas Council, leader of the Green political movement in Lithuania
 Dalia Grinkevičiūtė (1927–1987), doctor and writer about experiences of Lithuanian exiles near the Laptev Sea
 Bronė Kurmytė-Monkevičienė (1913–1975), actress
 Rapolas Okulič-Kazarinas (1856–1919), aviator, helped to organize the Lithuanian Armed Forces
 Petras Tarasenka (1892–1962), archaeologist, colonel
 Vytautas Rauba  1899-1920 aviator, helped to organize the Lithuanian Armed Forces First dead Lithuanian pilot who had his own medal

References

External links
Website of Kaunas city

Centre of Registers

Neighbourhoods of Kaunas